Janet Natalie Margolin (July 25, 1943 – December 17, 1993) was an American theater, television and film actress.

Early life 
Margolin was born in New York City, the daughter of Benjamin and Annette (née Lief) Margolin. Her father was a Russian-born accountant who founded the Nephrosis Foundation, now the Kidney Foundation of New York and her mother was a dental assistant. Her father had many friends and clients who were associated with theater and would often ask her to audition for roles. Until the late 1950s, Margolin aspired to become a doctor, yet was always interested in acting and decided to give it a try following insistence from her father's friends.

She attended the High School of Performing Arts and just prior to her graduation, did a screen test for Five Finger Exercise, where she was urged to sign a contract but declined, instead returning to New York.

Career 
Margolin's earliest acting roles were in a commercial for Zest and several instalments in the soap opera The Edge of Night. In 1961 at the age of 18, while a prop girl at the New York Shakespeare Festival, Margolin won a pivotal Broadway stage role as Anna in Morris West's Daughter of Silence, beating 200 other applicants. Despite mixed reaction, critics unanimously praised Margolin and she went on to be nominated for a Tony Award. In 1962, Margolin played her first movie role as the female lead in David and Lisa and traveled to Argentina in 1964 to feature in The Eavesdropper, where upon her return she signed a 1-film-a-year contract with 20th Century Fox. She co-starred with Marlon Brando in 1965's Morituri and with Steve McQueen in the western Nevada Smith.

By 1967, she was considered by the Baltimore Sun as being one of Hollywood's "brightest new stars," by then having featured in around 5 films. Numerous film studios made efforts to commit her to a long-term contract. Later that year, she also played Wanda in the movie Enter Laughing, as the love interest of the lead character David Kolowitz, played by debutante Reni Santoni.

In Take the Money and Run (1969), she played the love interest of the bumbling thief played by Woody Allen, and in Annie Hall (1977), she played the social-climbing wife of Allen's character.

In 1979, Margolin co-starred with Roy Scheider in director Jonathan Demme's thriller Last Embrace.

Margolin's last film appearance was in Ghostbusters II in 1989, and her last television roles were as a killer in an episode of Murder, She Wrote ("Deadly Misunderstanding") and as a victim in Columbo: Murder in Malibu in 1990.

Personal life 
In August 1968, Margolin married Jerome Brandt (b.1939) in Los Angeles; they divorced in October 1971. Later that decade in December 1979, she married actor/director Ted Wass and had two children, Julian and Matilda.

Margolin frequently and erroneously has been identified as the sister of actor Stuart Margolin and director Arnold Margolin, though she acted alongside Stuart Margolin in the pilot episode of the TV series Lanigan's Rabbi, where they appeared as husband and wife. She was a friend of producer/actress Jennifer Salt, who had co-starred with Wass in the 1970s sitcom Soap.

Margolin died of ovarian cancer at the age of 50 on December 17, 1993, in her Los Angeles home. She was cremated and her ashes were placed in an urn garden at Westwood Memorial Park in Los Angeles.

Filmography

Awards and nominations

References

External links

1943 births
1993 deaths
Actresses from New York City
American film actresses
American stage actresses
American television actresses
American people of Russian descent
Burials at Westwood Village Memorial Park Cemetery
Deaths from cancer in California
Deaths from ovarian cancer
20th-century American actresses
Jewish American actresses
20th-century American Jews